"Sick man of Europe" is a label given to a nation which is located in some part of Europe and experiencing a time of economic difficulty or impoverishment. 

Emperor Nicholas I of the Russian Empire is considered to be the first to use the term "Sick Man" to describe the Ottoman Empire in the mid-19th century. The characterization existed during the "Eastern Question" in diplomatic history, which also referred to the decline of the Ottoman Empire in terms of the balance of power in Europe. 

After the dissolution of the Ottoman Empire in the early 20th century, the term has been applied to other nations. In modern usage, the term has faced criticism due to its origins and arguable over-usage. 

Throughout the late 1960s and 1970s, the term is also used for United Kingdom.

Origin

Early usage 
Russian Tsar Nicholas I, seeking to expand into parts of the Ottoman Empire during the Eastern Question, had described Turkey as "sick" or "sick man" during his meeting with Austrian Prince Metternich in Münchengrätz, two months after the Treaty of Hünkâr İskelesi in September 1833. In his own writing, Metternich said he had argued against this characterization. Conventionally, foreign minister Metternich was opposed to the characterization of the Ottoman Empire as "sick man of the Bosphorus" because this could lead to his country, the Austrian Empire, becoming the "sick man of the Danube". Other historians, evaluating the conservative "Holy Alliance" of the time, have seen Metternich's foreign policy as aligned with Nicholas, including the policy towards the Ottoman Empire.

Crimean War 
British statesman John Russell in 1853, in the run up to the Crimean War, reported that Nicholas I of Russia described the Ottoman Empire as "a sick man—a very sick man", a "man who has fallen into a state of decrepitude", and a "sick man ... gravely ill".

There has been some degree of debate about the source of the quotation, which often relies on historical documents held or communicated personally. Historian Harold Temperley (1879–1939) gave the date for the first conversation as 9 January 1853, like Goldfrank. According to Temperley, Seymour in a private conversation had to push the Tsar to be more specific about the Ottoman Empire. Eventually, the Tsar stated, 
Turkey seems to be falling to pieces, the fall will be a great misfortune. It is very important that England and Russia should come to a perfectly good understanding ... and that neither should take any decisive step of which the other is not apprized [sic]. 
And then, closer to the attributed phrase: We have a sick man on our hands, a man gravely ill, it will be a great misfortune if one of these days he slips through our hands, especially before the necessary arrangements are made.

Different interpretations existed between the two countries on the "Eastern Question" by the time of the Crimean War. The British Ambassador G. H. Seymour agreed with Tsar Nicholas's diagnosis, but he very deferentially disagreed with the Tsar's recommended treatment of the patient; he responded, Your Majesty is so gracious that you will allow me to make one further observation. Your Majesty says the man is sick; it is very true; but your Majesty will deign to excuse me if I remark, that it is the part of the generous and strong man to treat with gentleness the sick and feeble man.Temperley then asserts, The 'sickliness' of Turkey obsessed Nicholas during his reign. What he really said was omitted in the Blue Book from a mistaken sense of decorum. He said not the 'sick man' but the "bear dies … the bear is dying … you may give him musk but even musk will not long keep him alive."

Christopher de Bellaigue argued that neither Nicholas nor Seymour completed the epithet with the prepositional phrase "of Europe".  

The first appearance of the phrase "sick man of Europe" appears in The New York Times (12 May 1860): The condition of Austria at the present moment is not less threatening in itself, though less alarming for the peace of the world, than was the condition of Turkey when the Tsar Nicholas invited England to draw up with him the last will and testament of the 'sick man of Europe.' It is, indeed, hardly within the range of probability that another twelvemonth should pass over the House of Habsburg without bringing upon the Austrian Empire a catastrophe unmatched in modern history since the downfall of Poland. The author of this article can be seen to be using the term to point to a second "sick man" of Europe, the Habsburg monarchy.

World War One 
Later, this view led the Allies in World War I to underestimate the Ottoman Empire, leading in part to the disastrous Gallipoli Campaign. However, the "sick man" eventually collapsed after defeat in the Middle Eastern theatre of World War I.

Post-World War I usage
After the demise of the Ottoman Empire, writers have described many nations as the "sick men" of Europe or the Old World, having at one point or another widespread economic misery, sociopolitical turmoil, lower public morale and (in the case of bigger countries) diminished global status, the 1920s-era Weimar Germany being one example. 

The Russian Empire in 1917 was described as the "Sick Man of Europe" in an edition of The New York Times from that year. In the 1917 article by Charles Richard Crane, the illness metaphor is used more directly, with the empire described as "Suffering From Overdose of Exaggerated Modernism in Socialist Reform Ideas", and "the danger for the patient lay in the fact that too many quacks and ignorant specialists were contending for the right to be admitted to the bedside and administer nostrums."

Swedish Diplomat and former Prime Minister Carl Bildt once referred to Serbia under the rule of Slobodan Milošević as a candidate for the new "sick man of Europe" in 1997. This is due to political instability in Yugoslavia and its former territories caused by Yugoslav Wars that rocked the Balkan region from 1991 until 2001.

In the late 1990s the foreign press  often labeled Germany with this term because of its economic problems, especially due to the costs of German reunification after 1990, which were estimated to amount to over €1.5 trillion (statement of Freie Universität Berlin). It continued to be used in the early 2000s, and as Germany slipped into recession in 2003.

In May 2005, The Economist attributed this title to Italy, describing it as "the real sick man of Europe." This refers to Italy's structural and political difficulties thought to inhibit economic reforms to relaunch economic growth. In 2018, Italy was again referred to as the "sick man of Europe" following post-election deadlock. In 2008, in an opinion piece criticizing the country's approach to economic reform, The Daily Telegraph also used the term to describe Italy, as did CNBC in 2020.

The post-Soviet Russia has been referred to as such in the book Kremlin Rising: Vladimir Putin's Russia and the End of Revolution by Peter Baker and Susan Glasser, and by Mark Steyn in his 2006 book America Alone: The End of the World as We Know It.

In 2007, The Economist described Portugal as "a new sick man of Europe".

A report by Morgan Stanley referred to France as the "new sick man of Europe." This label was reaffirmed in January 2014 by European newspapers such as The Guardian and Frankfurter Allgemeine.  They justified this with France's high unemployment, weak economic growth and poor industrial output.

In July 2009, the pejorative was given by EurActiv to Greece in view of the 2008 Greek riots, rising unemployment, and political corruption.

In spring 2011, Eurozine suggested that the European Union was the "sick man of Europe" by entitling an event focusing on the Eurozone crisis, "The EU: the real sick man of Europe?"

In 2015 and 2016, Finland was called the "sick man of Europe" due to its recession and lacklustre growth, in a time when virtually all other European countries have recovered from the Great Recession.

United Kingdom
Throughout the late 1960s and 1970s, the United Kingdom was sometimes characterized as the "sick man of Europe", first by commentators, and later at home by critics of the third Wilson/Callaghan ministry due to industrial strife and poor economic performance compared with other European countries. Some observers consider this era to have started with the devaluation of the pound in 1967, culminating with the so-called Winter of Discontent of 1978–79. At different points throughout the decade, numerous countries such as Italy, Spain, Portugal, France, and Greece were cited by the American business press as being "on the verge of sickness" as well. In the summer of 2017, the United Kingdom was again referred to as the "sick man of Europe" following the results of the supposed negative economic effects of the EU referendum the previous year which led to Brexit.

Scotland has been called the "sick man of Europe" several times, but for health reasons instead of economic.

During the COVID-19 pandemic, the United Kingdom has been termed the "sick man of Europe" after a new strain of coronavirus, the Alpha variant, led to a number of countries closing their borders to UK air travel. With the current political instability and political crisis under the Conservative party, specifically the October 2022 United Kingdom government crisis, July 2022 United Kingdom government crisis, Union disputes, falling economy and the cost of living crisis the term "Sick man of Europe" has been used to describe the UK and the Conservative party in general.

See also
 Eastern Question
 Ottoman Decline Thesis
 PIGS (economics)
 Sick man of Asia

References

External links

 

Politics of Europe
Political slurs
Politics of the Ottoman Empire
19th century in the Ottoman Empire
Anti-Ottomanism